The 2004 UCI Women's Road World Cup was the seventh edition of the UCI Women's Road World Cup. It consisted of seven races. There was a single change from 2003; the discontinued Amstel Gold Race was replaced by the newly-created Tour of Flanders for Women. Australian rider Oenone Wood won her first overall title.

Races

Final classification

External links

 
2004 in women's road cycling
UCI Women's Road World Cup